Sadar may refer to:

Places
 Sadar, Allahabad, a town and a nagar panchayat in Uttar Pradesh
 Sadar, Hazaribagh (community development block), Jharkhand, India
 Sadar, Uttar Pradesh, a tehsil in Pratapgarh district, India
 Sadar, Iran, a village in Hormozgan Province, Iran

Other
 Sadar (festival), a buffalo festival in Hyderabad, India
 El Sadar Stadium, in Pamplona, Navarre, Spain
 Delhi Sadar (Lok Sabha constituency), Lok Sabha constituency in Delhi, India
 Sadar North Baptist Association (SNBA), a Baptist community in Tripura, India

See also 
 Sadar Bazaar (disambiguation)
 Sadr (disambiguation)